Isaiah Langley (born October 13, 1996) is an American football cornerback who is currently a free agent. He played college football at USC.

Professional career

Oakland Raiders
On June 11, 2019, the Oakland Raiders signed Langley; along with wide receiver Montay Crockett before the start of minicamp. Langley was soon cut by Oakland on August 9.

Indianapolis Colts
On August 11, 2019, the Indianapolis Colts signed Langley. He was waived on August 31, 2019.

Legal issues

August 2019 arrest 
On August 31, 2019, Langley was arrested in Lake Forest, Illinois in connection to a string of Northern California robberies of UPS and FedEx drivers delivering mobile devices to cell phone stores. Seven men and women were initially charged and six guns were seized, including an assault rifle and illegal magazines.

Langley was identified through cell phone data, surveillance video and physical evidence, prosecutors said and is linked to robberies in Pleasant Hill, Fairfield and San Jose.

References

Living people
1996 births
American football cornerbacks
Indianapolis Colts players
USC Trojans football players